Mary Meriam (born 1955) is an American poet and editor. She is a founding editor of Headmistress Press, one of the few presses (possibly the only press) in the United States specializing in lesbian poetry.

Biography 

Mary Meriam was born in Passaic, New Jersey. She earned a B.A. in Poetry from Bennington College and an M.F.A. in Poetry from Columbia University. She has published four full-length collections of poetry and four chapbooks. Three of her books (Word Hot, Conjuring My Leafy Muse, and Girlie Calendar) make up the Lillian Trilogy, which is dedicated to her mentor, Lillian Faderman.

Her first full-length collection, Conjuring My Leafy Muse (2015), was warmly praised by Naomi Replansky, David Bergman, Willis Barnstone, and others; it was nominated for the 2015 Poets' Prize. Girlie Calendar (2016) has been similarly well received. A new collection, My Girl's Green Jacket (2018), was favorably reviewed by several advance readers, including Rhina Espaillat, Rachel Hadas, and Stu Watson.

Meriam founded Lavender Review, an e-zine of lesbian poetry and art, on Gay Pride Day, June 27, 2010. In 2013 she founded Headmistress Press, a lesbian poetry press, with Risa Denenberg.

Her poetry, reviews, and essays have been published widely in literary journals, including Poetry, The Cimarron Review, The Evansville Review, The Gay & Lesbian Review, The Journal of Lesbian Studies, Literary Imagination, Measure, Mezzo Cammin, Rattle, Sinister Wisdom, and The Women's Review of Books; in anthologies, such as Nasty Women Poets: An Unapologetic Anthology of Subversive Verse, Measure for Measure: An Anthology of Poetic Meters, and Obsession: Sestinas in the 21st Century; and on websites such as the Poetry Foundation, Ms. magazine, and The New York Times.

Meriam often uses traditional forms in her poetry. She invented an original form called "Basic Me" which has been used by other poets, including Catherine Tufariello and Marly Youmans.

Books

Full-length poetry collections
 Pools of June, Exot Books, 2022
 My Girl's Green Jacket, Headmistress Press, 2018
 Girlie Calendar, Headmistress Press, 2014
 Conjuring My Leafy Muse, Headmistress Press, 2013

Chapbooks
 The Lesbian, Seven Kitchens Press, 2016
 Word Hot, Headmistress Press, 2013
 The Poet's Zodiac, Seven Kitchens Press, 2011
 The Countess of Flatbroke, Modern Metrics, 2006

Honors and awards 
 2017: "The Earth" nominated for a Pushcart Prize by SWWIM
 2016: Girlie Calendar selected for the American Library Association's Over the Rainbow List
 2016: Winner of the San Diego Reader Sonnet Contest
 2015: Conjuring My Leafy Muse nominated for the 2015 Poets' Prize
 2014: Irresistible Sonnets selected for the Washington Independent Review of Books Best Books List for June 2014

References

External links 
 Mary Meriam website
 Lavender Review, lesbian poetry and art journal

1955 births
Living people
American women poets
20th-century American poets
20th-century American women writers
21st-century American poets
21st-century American women writers
People from Passaic, New Jersey
Poets from New Jersey
Formalist poets
American LGBT poets
American women editors
Bennington College alumni
Columbia University School of the Arts alumni